The AC Cobra GT Roadster is a sports car manufactured by British company AC Cars. It is an iteration of the AC Cobra.

History
The AC Cobra GT Roadster was announced by teaser images of the manufacturer on 21 December 2022 before its official presentation in April 2023.

Specifications
The GT has a carbon/composite body placed on an extruded aluminum chassis. The Cobra GT Roadster offers a 5.0 L Coyote V8 engine from the Ford Mustang, with a compressor and delivering 663 hp for 780 NM of torque.

References

Upcoming car models
Cobra GT Roadster
Rear-wheel-drive vehicles
Roadsters